Miklós Kovacsics (April 20, 1953 – February 2, 2005) was a Hungarian handball player who competed in the 1980 Summer Olympics. He was born in Pécs. In 1980 he played three matches as a member of the Hungarian team which finished fourth in the Olympic tournament.

References

1953 births
2005 deaths
Handball players at the 1980 Summer Olympics
Hungarian male handball players
Olympic handball players of Hungary
Sportspeople from Pécs